Ellon may refer to:

Ellon, Aberdeenshire, Scotland
Ellon, Calvados, France